Thomas Edward Gullickson (born August 14, 1950) is an American prelate of the Roman Catholic Church. He has served as an apostolic nuncio in the Holy See diplomatic corps since 2004.  Gullickson was posted to Switzerland and Liechtenstein from 2015 until his retirement at the end of 2020.

Early years
Born in Sioux Falls, South Dakota, United States, Thomas Gullickson was ordained to the priesthood for the Diocese of Sioux Falls by Bishop Lambert Hoch on July 27, 1976. He studied canon law at the Pontifical Gregorian University in Rome, writing his doctoral dissertation in 1985 on The Diocesan Bishop: Moderator and Sponsor of the Ministry of the Word. A Comparative Study of Tridentine Legislation and the 1983 Code of Canon Law.

To prepare for a diplomatic career, Gullickson entered the Pontifical Ecclesiastical Academy in Rome in 1981. He joined the Holy See diplomatic service on May 1, 1985, and served in diplomatic missions to Rwanda, Austria, Czechoslovakia, Jerusalem, Israel and Germany.

Nuncio
On October 2, 2004, Pope John Paul II appointed Gullickson as titular archbishop of Polymartium and apostolic nuncio to Trinidad and Tobago, the Bahamas, Dominica, Saint Kitts and Nevis, Saint Lucia, and Saint Vincent and the Grenadines – all island nations in the Caribbean Sea. Gullickson received his episcopal consecration on November 11, 2004, from Cardinal Giovanni Lajolo, with Bishops Robert Carlson and Paul Dudley as co-consecrators.

On December 15, 2004, Gullickson was given additional appointments as apostolic nuncio to other Caribbean nations: Antigua and Barbuda, Barbados, Jamaica, Guyana, and Suriname. On December 20, 2004, he was named as apostolic nuncio to Grenada. Gullickson was named apostolic nuncio to Ukraine on May 21, 2011. While there, Gullickson posted on Twitter and on his blog his criticism of Pope Francis regarding family planning, the eucharist, the pope's criticism of the Roman Curia, and the Vatican's relations with Russia.

Pope Francis appointed Gullickson Apostolic Nuncio to Switzerland and Liechtenstein on September 5, 2015. Gullickson announced in October 2020 his retirement as apostolic nuncio and said that he planned to retire in Sioux Falls. Pope Francis accepted his resignation on December 31, 2020.

Views on liturgy
Gullickson has frequently expressed his preference for the extraordinary form of the mass in which the priest faces the altar in the same direction as the congregation.  He considers it a step to renew what he sees as a proper reverence for the liturgy.

See also 

List of diplomatic missions of the Holy See
 List of heads of the diplomatic missions of the Holy See

References

External links
Gullickson's blogs
 Island Envoy (2006–2011)
 Deo Volente Ex Animo (2011–2015)
 ad montem myrrhae (2015– )

1950 births
Living people
21st-century American Roman Catholic titular archbishops
Apostolic Nuncios to Ukraine
Apostolic Nuncios to Switzerland
Apostolic Nuncios to Liechtenstein
Apostolic Nuncios to Barbados
Apostolic Nuncios to Antigua and Barbuda
Apostolic Nuncios to the Bahamas
Apostolic Nuncios to Dominica
Apostolic Nuncios to Jamaica
Apostolic Nuncios to Grenada
Apostolic Nuncios to Guyana
Apostolic Nuncios to Saint Kitts and Nevis
Apostolic Nuncios to Saint Lucia
Apostolic Nuncios to Suriname
Apostolic Nuncios to Saint Vincent and the Grenadines
Apostolic Nuncios to Trinidad and Tobago
Roman Catholic Diocese of Sioux Falls
People from Sioux Falls, South Dakota
Catholics from South Dakota